Gurgen Baghdasaryan (born 13 August 1977), is an Armenian politician, Member of the National Assembly of Armenia of Bright Armenia's faction.

References 

1977 births
Living people
21st-century Armenian politicians